Emeopedus alboguttatus is a species of longhorn beetle in the subfamily Lamiinae. It was described by Fisher in 1935.

References

Acanthocinini
Beetles described in 1935